Occultism and the far right may refer to:
Ariosophy (pre-World War II Germanic mysticism)
Fascist mysticism
Occultism in Nazism (1919s–1930s)
Esoteric Nazism (1950s–1980s)
Traditionalist School (perennialism)  
National Socialist black metal

See also
Hitler and the occult (disambiguation)
National mysticism
Neo-völkisch movements (disambiguation)
QAnon
Religious aspects of Nazism